Ulmas Mirsaidovich Mirsaidov (born November 10, 1945) is a Tajik theoretical chemist. He is the Mirsaidov Ulmas Mirsaidovich Professor of Chemistry.
 He is Director of Nuclear and Radiation Safety Agency under AS RT.

Biography
Mirsaidov was born in Ura-Tyube, Tajik SSR. In 1967, he graduated with honours from Moscow D.I.Mendeleev Chemical and Technological Institute and was assigned to a job in Tajik Polytechnic Institute and appointed to a position of assistant at Chemical technology chair.
In 1970, he entered to the post graduate courses in I.S.Kurnakov Institute of General and Inorganic Chemistry under USSR AS and in 1973 he defended a PhD thesis.

Career
Starting 1973 he worked in V. I. Nikitin Institute of Chemistry. under AS RT. From 1988 till 2003, he was a director of this Institute. The following degrees and titles were awarded: Senior staff scientist on specialty inorganic chemistry 1975, doctor of chemical sciences 1985, professor 1988, corresponding member of the AS 1987, academician of the AS RT 1993. In 1995 he was elected as a president of the AS RT and held this position till February 2005. Currently he is working as a Director of Nuclear and Radiation Safety Agency under AS RT.

Scientific articles
Academician Mirsaidov Ulmas Mirsaidovich is the author of 450 scientific articles, 15 monographs, 75 inventor's certificates and patents. Under his supervision, 9 doctors of sciences and more than 40 PhD dissertations were defended. He founded perfect scientific school of chemists in the country which has international importance. He is a great authority in the field of hydrogen compounds chemistry. For the first time in Tajikistan, he started systematic investigations in the field of lightweight metals hydrides and power-consuming substances chemistry. These investigations results made it possible to reveal and justify mechanism, behavior regularity and many reactions directivity.

He is a great propagandist of science history. In his works Prezidenti AN Tajikistana, Sarvaroni fidokori ilm, Oni sostavlyayut slavu tajikskoi nauki and Ustodoni man, the well-known scientists' lives and activity of the country are described. U.M.Mirsaidov makes an example of his meetings with them, their characters, talents and desire, their professionalism.

Scientific and political activities

A number of works carried out in 1970 – 1990 years were relevant to aluminum chemistry – potential solid propellant components and hydrogen sources.

Academician U.M.Mirsaidov's synthesized compounds are used as hydrogen sources, catalyst and selective reducing agents as well as effective materials for enginery.

Professor Mirsaidov Ulmas Mirsaidovich for the first time carried out systematic investigation of phase equilibrium in ternary system "non-transient metal borohydride – transient element borohydride – solvent". Based on these investigations, a synthesis method of individual rare earth metals (REM) borohydrides is created which is based on use of more accessible and inexpensive sodium borohydride and sufficiently general. For the first time, in accordance with developed method a whole row of REM borohydrides, their complexes with alkaline metals borohydrides and tetraalkylammonium are derived. Reliability of derived results is confirmed by detailed investigation of physical and chemical properties of dedicated compounds.

Physical and chemical analysis of several systems based on aluminum hydride compounds enabled academician U.M.Mirsaidov to prove existence of complex binary hydride complexes, to carry out simple synthesis method of earlier unknown, or known, but not dedicated in individual condition hepta-, hexa-, and tetrahydroaluminates of alkaline and alkali-earth metals with use of binary hydrides which are more inexpensive and easily accessible sources of hydrogen hydrides.

Original and effective methods of different hydride complexes synthesis are proposed on the basis of systematic investigation of binary hydrides interaction and metals alumohydrides with electron-seeking reagent of different acceptor force (chlorinated reagents, aryl (alkyl) halogenides, boro-, and lithium alumohydride, etc.)

After USSR disintegration Prof. U.M.Mirsaidov focused the whole scientific potential of Chemistry Institute on solution of industry and agricultural problems of sovereign Tajikistan. He paid specific attention to problems of industrial residues utilization, local raw stock utilization as initial materials as well as ecological problems of chemical and metallurgical industry. Particularly, under direct supervision of academician U.M.Mirsaidov, the problem of solid wastes dump's utilization of Tajik Aluminum Plant as raw stock for production of metallic aluminum, synthetic iron, ferrosilicium, etc.

Fundamental researches results of U.M.Mirsaidov are tested and introduced with positive conclusions in Isphara hydrometallurgy plant (Tajik SSR) and PA "Navoiazot" (Uzbek SSR) and highly evaluated by USSR AS’ Commission (Vestnik of USSR AS, 1980y.,№9), Interagency Commissions (1976, 1981,1986 yy.) with participation of several customers.

During the recent years, U.M. Mirsaidov carried out big activities on development of synthesis technology of new substances with specified properties. The staff of department headed by U.M.Mirsaidov developed one stage synthesis method of “catalyst” for new techniques needs with expected economic effect 6 million rubles (data from 1990).

Professor U.M.Mirsaidov makes great contributions to scientific and organizational activity of the AS RT and Institute of chemistry AS RT. As a president of AS RT he carried out great activities on strengthening of research and development base, establishment and development of basic research subdivisions of AS RT. He was director-organizer of Institute of water problems, hydropower engineering and ecology AS RT and Nuclear and Radiation Safety Agency of AS RT.

A number of major events of international scale are conducted under supervision of U.M. Mirsaidov. The Academy of Sciences has agreements and cooperates with more than 50 research centers. With the active participation of U.M. Mirsaidov, the Academy of Sciences became a member of the following international organizations:

	AASA – Academy of Sciences Association for Asia
	IAAS – International Association of the Academy of Sciences
	TWAS – Third World Academy of Sciences,
	IAP  – International Academy Panel
	ICSU – International Council of Scientific Units

With sponsorship of the Ministry of Foreign Affairs and Presidium of AS
RT, the Republic of Tajikistan became a member of IAEA – International Atomic Energy Agency, ISTC – International Science and Technology Center. U.M. Mirsaidov is the National Contact Point from Tajikistan for these organizations. 
Many of his students are working in different fields of the national economy and are at the head of research units in our country and abroad. He trained PhD’s for Nigeria and Syria.

Only a person can be considered as a real leader who is able to properly select scientific brainpower and further to direct their activity in required direction. Academician U.M.Mirsaidov skillfully selects scientific brainpowers. This is certified by number of followers who are successfully working in different research institutions and also abroad. 
He pays specific attention to scientific publications. Professor U.M.Mirsaidov was editor-in-chief “Reports of the AS RT” from 1995 till February 2005.

Generally speaking, science is integral part of culture and it must serve for enrichment of society’s spiritual life, moral health of a nation. In this respect, the course of U.M.Mirsaidov's life is striking example.

Academician U.M.Mirsaidov is a man of high responsibility and duty in front of science and society. His circle of interests is very wide. He cares about role and place of science and education in society's life, ecology problems, etc. 
The ability of U.M.Mirsaidov to unite a very together team is the reason not only for his immense prestige but his personal charm of always being simply and friendly man.

U.M.Mirsaidov is the founder and leader of research school on hydrogen energetics. This school has the high priority. Many large-scale all-USSR events on hydrides chemistry was conducted in Dushanbe (all-USSR conferences 1987, 1991 yy. several others).

Starting from 1991, professor U.M.Mirsaidov is the chair of dissertation council on defending of doctoral and PhD (kandidat nauk) dissertations under Institute of Chemistry AS RT. The council has a high priority in High Attestation Committee of Russian Federation. Up to now more than 40 doctoral and more than 300 PhD (kandidat nauk) dissertations in the field of inorganic, organic and physical chemistry are defended in the Council in the area of chemical and technical sciences. 
Currently, owing to U.M.Mirsaidov the most required directions as complex reprocessing of mineral raw materials and residues as well as radioecology are developing.

During his presidency of the AS RT, he contributed a lot to the increase of AS RT’s academicians and corresponding-members’ fee. In the AS RT a number of great scientists of our country were elected (10 academicians, 37 corresponding-members). 
He is a great propagandist of our science history. In his works “Prezidenti AN Tajikistana”, “Sarvaroni fidokori ilm”, “Oni sostavlyayut slavu tajikskoi nauki” i “Ustodoni man”, the well-known scientists’ life and activity of our country are described. U.M.Mirsaidov makes an example of his meetings with them, their characters, talents and desire, their professionalism.

Over a period of his activity as president of the AS RT, academician U.M.Mirsaidov strongly practiced principle of faithful service to the people, the foundation of which is laid by organizers. In front of scientists of Academy he set the problem of mobilization of statehood development, socio-economic and spiritual advance of the country. 
Going through tough and sensitive for our country time, he was able to preserve scientific potential of the Academy, our scientific manpower. By his activities, he demonstrated scientific talent and organizational capabilities. He is a member of several large international organizations and academies.

Under supervision of U.M.Mirsaidov, the 50th anniversary of the AS RT was brilliantly conducted. The jubilee where delegations from 9 CIS countries participated became real triumph of Tajik science. Academicians B.E.Paton, N.P.Laverov, J.J.Jenbaev, Vityaz and others highly appreciated the contribution of Tajik scientists to the world science.

In his fruitful activity U.M.Mirsaidov wonderfully combines abilities of scientist, organizer and teacher. During many years, he delivered lecturers in Tajik Technical University. U.M.Mirsaidov’s lecturers were distinguished by irreproachable logic as well as deep material possession. He was the chair of state examination committees in Tajik State National University and Tajik State Pedagogical University.

In 2005, U.M.Mirsaidov was outplaced to Nuclear and radiation safety agency (NRSA) AS RT – State regulatory authority in the field of radiation protection. As director of NRSA AS RT he strengthens the legislative and regulatory framework. By his direct participation, the parliament of the country adopted the following laws:

	Law on radiation safety
	Law on use of atomic energy

The Government of the country adopts a number of regulations in the field of radiation safety. In NRSA AS RT under supervision of U.M.Mirsaidov, the basic manufacturing scheme of complex reprocessing of uranic ores and uranium industry residues are developed, effective sorbents for purification of uranic waters are revealed. The radionuclide monitoring of Tajikistan bio-environment is carried out.

By support of international donors he constructed the laboratory building of NRSA AS RT where equipment installation of three laboratories: spectral, calibration and radiochemistry is taking place.

U.M.Mirsaidov established effective structure of country’s regulatory authority on radiation safety, set up license process of organizations dealing with sources of ionizing radiation.

U.M.Mirsaidov makes great efforts in the field of knowledge preservation in the field of radiation safety, security of radioactive sources, strengthening of technical cooperation with IAEA.

U.M.Mirsaidov's constant efforts on effectiveness increase of Technical Cooperation Programs allowed implementation of the projects in the field of nuclear medicine, Republican oncology center modernization, soil erosion identification by the help of radionuclides, carrying out monitoring of Tajikistan’s uranium tailing dumps and re-equipment in SE “Vostokrdemet” laboratory and others.

The high priority of NRSA AS RT allows carrying out large scale international conferences and seminars annually in Dushanbe under the auspices of the IAEA.  With the support of International Science and Technology Center (ISTC), international conferences in the field of weapons of mass destruction non-proliferation are carried out (2007, 2010 yy). 
In the person of U.M.Mirsaidov, we see real scientist–humanist, who devoted all his power, talent, knowledge for development of science, flourishing of country. By his numerous papers, he made invaluable contribution to the development of science. 
U.M.Mirsaidov combines intensive scientific activity with governmental. He was elected as the Committee Chair of Majlisi Milli – Majlisi Olli (upper House of Parliament) of the Republic of Tajikistan and as the deputy group chair on Dushanbe’s science and education.

He is well known in all corners of the globe, he made presentations in more than 40 countries of the world (USA, Germany, France, Sweden, Finland, Austria, China, India, Ecuador, Morocco, Norway, England, Spain, Poland, Italy, Greece and others.).
There is no doubt that excellent chemical school of the academician U.M.Mirsaidov in our country will contribute a lot for the development of our republic.

References

External links
 V.I.NIKITIN INSTITUTE OF CHEMISTRY, ACADEMY OF SCIENCES OF THE REPUBLIC OF TAJIKISTAN
 The Eurasian Patent Organization
 Journal of scientific publications
 Laboratory staff
 Nrsa.tj

 Historical Dictionary of Tajikistan

1945 births
Living people
20th-century chemists
21st-century chemists
Tajikistani scientists
D. Mendeleev University of Chemical Technology of Russia alumni
Members of the Tajik Academy of Sciences
Rare earth scientists
Soviet chemists